The Kazakhstan women's national field hockey team represents Kazakhstan in women's international field hockey competitions.

Tournament history

Asian Games
1998 – 6th place
2010 – 7th place
2014 – 6th place
2018 – 10th place
2022 – Qualified

Asia Cup
1999 – 5th place
2004 – 5th place
2009 – 6th place
2013 – 6th place
2017 – 7th place

AHF Cup
1997 –

Hockey World League
2012–13 – 26th place
2014–15 – 29th place
2016–17 – 32nd place

FIH Hockey Series
2018–19 – First round

Current squad 
Kazakhstan Women's Hockey. 
 Bakhavaddin Guzal (C,GK)
 Mahanova Aigerim
 Khairusheva Dilnaz
 Sazontova Natalya
 Bissirova Alina
 Koishybek Nagima
 Lyapina Viktoriya
 Nursilanova Sabina
 Domashneva Vera
 Utigenova Elvira
 Bolganbayeva Karlygash
 Izbassarova Gulsina
 Kryazheva Alena
 Olzhabayeva Dilnaz (GK)
 Sabazova Symbat
 Lobanova Viktoriya
 Beisenbay Balzhan
 Berdenova Sabina

See also
Kazakhstan men's national field hockey team

References

External links
FIH profile

Asian women's national field hockey teams
Field hockey
Nationla team